Victor François de Broglie, 2nd duc de Broglie (19 October 171830 March 1804)  was a French aristocrat and soldier and a marshal of France. He served with his father, François-Marie, 1st duc de Broglie, at Parma and Guastalla, and in 1734 obtained a colonelcy.

In the War of the Austrian Succession, he took part in the storming of Prague in 1742, and was made a brigadier. In 1744 and 1745 he saw further service on the Rhine, and he succeeded his father as 2nd duc de Broglie on the old duke's death in 1745.  He was made a Maréchal de Camp, and he subsequently served with Marshal de Saxe in the Low Countries, and was present at Roucoux, Val and Maastricht. At the end of the war, he was made a lieutenant-general.

During the Seven Years' War, he served successively under Louis Charles César Le Tellier, duc d'Estrées, Charles de Rohan, prince de Soubise, and Contades, being present at all the battles from Hastenbeck onwards. His victory over Prince Ferdinand at Bergen (1759) won him the rank of marshal of France from the French King Louis XV and the title of Prince of the Holy Roman Empire Reichsfürst  from Holy Roman Emperor Francis I.

In 1759, he won the Battle of Bergen and followed that with the capture the city of Minden, later fighting at the Battle of Minden under the command of Contades, whom he would succeed in command. In 1760, he won an action at the Korbach, but was defeated at Villinghausen in 1761. After the war, he fell into disgrace and was not recalled to active employment until 1778, when he was given command of the troops designed to operate against Great Britain, when France intervened on the Thirteen Colonies' side during the American war of independence. He played a prominent part in the French Revolution, which he opposed with determination; he commanded troops at Versailles in July 1789 and briefly served as Louis XVI's minister of war before fleeing France. After his emigration, the duc de Broglie commanded the Army of the Princes for a short time (1792).

Since the duke's eldest son, Charles-Louis-Victor, prince de Broglie, died in the Terror, the succession fell to his grandson, who became the third duc de Broglie. He died at Münster in 1804.

Issue

 Charles-Louis-Victor, prince de Broglie
 Bishop Maurice-Jean de Broglie

See also
 France in the Seven Years War
 France in the American Revolutionary War

Notes

References

 "Broglie, Victor-François de" at Historydata

1718 births
1804 deaths
Military personnel from Paris
Marshals of France
Victor-Francois
Victor-Francois
Secretaries of State for War (France)
French military personnel of the War of the Austrian Succession
French military personnel of the Seven Years' War
18th-century French politicians